Arnaldo Benfenati (26 May 1924 – 9 June 1986) was an Italian cyclist. He was born in Bologna. He won a silver medal in team pursuit at the 1948 Summer Olympics in London, together with Rino Pucci, Anselmo Citterio and Guido Bernardi.

References

External links
 
 

1924 births
1986 deaths
Italian male cyclists
Olympic cyclists of Italy
Olympic silver medalists for Italy
Olympic medalists in cycling
Cyclists at the 1948 Summer Olympics
Medalists at the 1948 Summer Olympics
Cyclists from Bologna